A train station is a railway facility or area where trains regularly stop to load or unload passengers or freight or both.

Train station may also refer to:
 Train Station (film), a 2015 multi-director feature film
 "Train Station", song by Basshunter on the 2004 album The Bassmachine